Uei-tepui, also known as Wei-tepui, Cerro El Sol or Serra do Sol is a tepui on the border between Brazil and Venezuela. It may be considered the southernmost member of the Eastern Tepuis chain.

While the peak of Uei-tepui lies completely in Venezuelan territory, large part of the main ridge forms the boundary between Venezuela and Brazil.

See also
 Distribution of Heliamphora

References

Further reading

 Kok, P.J.R., R.D. MacCulloch, D.B. Means, K. Roelants, I. Van Bocxlaer & F. Bossuyt (7 August 2012).  Current Biology 22(15): R589–R590.  []

Inselbergs of South America
Tepuis of Venezuela
Tepuis of Brazil
Mountains of Venezuela
International mountains of South America
Brazil–Venezuela border
Mountains of Bolívar (state)
Landforms of Roraima